Roberto Carlos Sosa (born 24 January 1975) is an Argentine former professional football striker turned coach.

Playing career
Sosa was born in Santa Rosa, La Pampa. He started playing for Gimnasia y Esgrima La Plata in 1995. His best season with Gimnasia was in 1997–98 when he scored 28 goals in 38 matches. He was the top scorer in the 1998 Argentine Torneo Clausura, with 17 goals. After this excellent season, Sosa was transferred to Italy, to play with Serie A team Udinese.

He spent almost 10 years playing in Europe, playing with Serie A and Serie B teams Ascoli and Messina. He also spent four years with S.S.C. Napoli between 2004 and 2008, helping Napoli to return to the Italian Serie A. Then, he returned to Argentina to play for his first club Gimnasia y Esgrima de La Plata, which was struggling to keep its Primera A standing. Even though Sosa had a mediocre 2008/09 season, scoring only 2 goals in 24 games, he helped Gimnasia to avoid relegation.

Perhaps, his most memorable moment during his last return to Gimnasia happened on 5 April 2009. Sosa was unable to deliver on his promise to score twice against derby rivals Estudiantes, and became upset with those who criticized him for running his mouth, citing his ten-year playing spell in Europe.

In June 2010, Sosa signed in for Sanremese. In December 2010, he received death threats to leave the club by the 'Ndrangheta. He was out of the team by February. He finished the season playing for FC Rapperswil-Jona in Switzerland Third Division. At the end of the season, he retired.

Roberto Sosa was not a technical player, but he was an effective scorer. Overall, he scored 112 goals in 385 games.

Post-playing and coaching career
After his retirement, Sosa has been working as a color commentator for Sky Italia and took his coaching badges. On 1 August 2014, he was appointed head coach of recently relegated Serie D club Sorrento. He left Sorrento by mutual consent on 5 January 2015.

He then served as head coach of Eccellenza Campania club Savoia throughout the 2015–16 season, ended in third place.

In September 2016, Sosa accepted an offer from newly promoted Serie D club Vultur Rionero.

Personal life
Sosa's son Tomás, born 2001 in Udine, followed on his father's footsteps and he plays for Serie C club Pontedera as of February 2023.

Honours

Udinese
UEFA Intertoto Cup: 2000

Napoli
 Serie C1
 Winners (1): 2005–06

References

External links
 raisport player profile 
Roberto Sosa – Argentine Primera statistics at Fútbol XXI  
Guardian statistics

1975 births
Living people
People from Santa Rosa, La Pampa
Argentine footballers
Argentine expatriate footballers
Expatriate footballers in Italy
Expatriate footballers in Switzerland
Argentine expatriate sportspeople in Italy
A.C.R. Messina players
Club de Gimnasia y Esgrima La Plata footballers
Udinese Calcio players
Boca Juniors footballers
Ascoli Calcio 1898 F.C. players
S.S.C. Napoli players
S.S.D. Sanremese Calcio players
Association football forwards
Serie A players
Serie B players
Argentine Primera División players
A.S.D. Sorrento managers
FC Rapperswil-Jona players
Argentine football managers